The 1994 European Shooting Championships was the 40th edition (included the European Shooting Championships), of the global shotgun competition, European Shotgun Championships, organised by the International Shooting Sport Federation.

Winners
Events was 22, 12 men and 10 women.

Men

Women

See also
 European Shooting Confederation
 International Shooting Sport Federation
 List of medalists at the European Shooting Championship

References

External links
 
 European Champion Archive Results at Sport-komplett-de

European Shooting Championships
European Shotgun Championships